Koriella was a station on the short Alexandra branch line. When it opened in 1890, the station was called Alexandra Road and a post office operated there from 14 May 1891 until c.1902. The station's name changed to Lily in 1909, Rhodes in 1910, and Koriella in 1916.

The station was closed to all traffic on 2 April 1973, and the line closed on 8 November 1978.

Infrastructure
The station consisted of a loop siding and a small island platform with a medium-sized tin passenger shelter. There was a goods yard with three tracks, including a goods shed.

References

Disused railway stations in Victoria (Australia)
Railway stations closed in 1978
Railway stations in Australia opened in 1890